Liv Gjølstad (born 9 January 1945) is a Norwegian judge.

She was born in Tønsberg. She graduated with the cand.jur. degree from the University of Oslo in 1969. She worked under the Norwegian Parliamentary Ombudsman from 1971, as a presiding judge in Eidsivating from 1983 and as Supreme Court Justice from 1988 to 2015.

She has also been a board member of the Norwegian Nuclear Energy Safety Authority from 1990 to 1992, deputy board member of the Norwegian Public Service Pension Fund from 1993 to 1996 and council member of the Labour Court of Norway.

She is married to bureaucrat Thorbjørn Gjølstad.

References

Supreme Court of Norway justices
University of Oslo alumni
People from Tønsberg
Living people
1945 births
Order of Saint Olav